William H. Winsborough was an American computer scientist, having taught at University of Texas at San Antonio and an Elected Fellow of the American Association for the Advancement of Science.

References

Year of birth missing (living people)
Fellows of the American Association for the Advancement of Science
American computer scientists
University of Texas at San Antonio faculty